Atmoda ('Awakening' in Latvian) was a weekly newspaper in Latvian SSR and Latvia issued from December 1988 to April 1992. It was published by the Popular Front of Latvia (PFL) and was the first independent, opposition paper in the Latvian SSR. The name of the newspaper is a reference to Latvian revival movements known as the Latvian National Awakenings.

For most of its run, the chief editor of Atmoda was journalist Elita Veidemane, and its editorial policy was independent from the PFL leadership. The newspaper was issued in the Latvian and Russian languages, with the English edition Awakening being published every month. Initially issued under the same name, in 1990 the Russian edition was renamed to Baltijskoje vremja ('The Baltic Times'). Many Russian people of culture and science in Latvia supported the PFL. The newspaper was popular not only in Latvia, but among the population of the Soviet Union, and the Russian edition peaked at 80,000 in circulation. The Latvian and Russian editions had a total print run of 165,000 in 1989.

Atmoda, as a token of recognition of rights of Russians by PFL, was a ground of insinuations by competing more radical nationalist political parties, such as Latvian National Independence Movement, that PFL was ridden with Moscow KGB spies to control the national movement in Latvia.

In January 1991, Communist functionaries occupied the national print house claiming it was party property, and Atmoda had to be printed in Šiauliai.

Both foreign-language editions were discontinued in 1992. In 1993, a dispute erupted about the fate of mass media in the new independent state. PFL wanted to see Atmoda as an organ of party, while journalists stood on freedom of the press. This resulted in a court suit for the division of assets and the appearance of various splinter newspapers and magazines, notably Atmoda Atpūtā led by Veidemane which was published until 1996. The last issue of Atmoda was published on April 7, 1992, although the information bulletin version of the paper was issued by the PFL until 1994.

References

 Bruce J. Evensen, The Role of Mass Media in a Newly Emerging Democracy: The Latvian Case Study, 1994 AEJMC Proc. pp. 47–71.
 http://www.latvija20gadsimts.lv/apkopojums/notikumu-hronologija/tresa-atmoda/

1988 establishments in the Soviet Union
1992 disestablishments in Latvia
Defunct newspapers published in Latvia
Defunct weekly newspapers
Latvian-language newspapers
Publications established in 1988
Publications disestablished in 1992
Russian-language newspapers published in Latvia
1988 establishments in Latvia